Mwinda is a Canadian free quarterly bilingual magazine for Afro-Caribbean young adults. The glossy, full colour magazine covers culture, lifestyle and fashion with an intimate tone. Mwinda Magazine also features reports on social and political issues. It is published by Mwinda publications and was founded in 2008 by Toward Excellence graduate Messia Ditshimba and Tyson Mutombo. They also edit the magazine. The headquarters is in Richmond, British Columbia.

References

External links

Lifestyle magazines published in Canada
Quarterly magazines published in Canada
Free magazines
Magazines established in 2008
Magazines published in British Columbia
Bilingual magazines